This is a list of venues used for professional and college baseball in Louisville, Kentucky. The information is a compilation of the information contained in the references listed.

Louisville Baseball Park
Home of: Louisville Grays NL 1876–1877
Location: 4th Street (east, first base); Hill Street (south, third base); 6th Street (west, left field); Magnolia Avenue (north, right field) – across Magnolia to the south from Central Park
Currently: St. James Court

Eclipse Park (I)
Home of:
semi-pro teams starting about 1874
Louisville Eclipse AA (1882–1892), NL (1992–early 1893) 
Location: 28th Street (east); Elliott Street (south); 29th Street (west); Magazine Street (north)
Currently: Elliott Park, a public park

Eclipse Park (II)
Home of:
Louisville Colonels – NL (early 1893-1899)
Louisville Colonels – Western Association (1901 - partial season)
Location: 28th Street (east); Broadway (north) – just south of Eclipse Park (I)
Currently: Commercial buildings

Eclipse Park (III)
Home of: Louisville Colonels – American Association (1902–1922)
Location: 7th Street (east, right field); West Kentucky Street (south, first base); 8th Street (west, third base); Florence (now Garland) (north, left field)
Currently: Residential

Parkway Field
Home of:
Louisville Colonels – AA (1923–1956)
University of Louisville
Location: Eastern Parkway (north, left field); Brook Street (east, right field); part of the University of Louisville campus
Currently: athletic field

Cardinal Stadium aka Fairgrounds Stadium
Home of:
Louisville Colonels – AA (1957–1962)
Louisville Colonels – IL (1968–1972)
Louisville Redbirds/Riverbats – AA (1982–1998), IL (1999)
University of Louisville
Location: 937 Phillips Lane – Freedom Hall and Phillips Lane (south, home plate); Fairgrounds Road and I-65 (east, right/center field); Fairgrounds road and Crittenden Drive (west, left field) – part of Kentucky Exposition Center
Currently: demolished, vacant lot

Louisville Slugger Field
Home of: Louisville Riverbats/Bats – IL (2000–2019), Triple-A East (2021–present)
 Also used by Louisville City FC (soccer) from 2015–2019.
Location: 401 East Main Street – Main Street (south, home plate); Preston Street (west, left field); Witherspoon Street and I-64 (north, center field); parking lot and I-65 (east, right field)

Jim Patterson Stadium
Home of: University of Louisville (2005–present)
Location: Central Avenue (south, first base); 3rd Street (west, third base); railroad tracks (east, right and center fields); Tway Way (north, left field)

See also
 Lists of baseball parks

References
Peter Filichia, Professional Baseball Franchises, Facts on File, 1993.

External links
SABR article on Eclipse Park
Pictures of Louisville ballparks
Pictures of Louisville baseball subjects

Louisville
Louisville
Louisville
Baseball parks
Baseball parks
baseball parks